Thomas Cottam (1549 – 30 May 1582) was an English Catholic priest and martyr from Lancashire, who was executed during the reign of Elizabeth I.

Life

Cottam was born to Protestant parents, Laurence Cottam of Dilworth and Anne Brewer, but was converted as an adult to Catholicism by Thomas Pound. He studied at Brasenose College, Oxford, and received his M.A. on 14 July 1572, before leaving for London, where he became master of a grammar school.  It was there that he met Pound and decided to head to Douai to become a priest.

He was ordained a deacon at Cambrai in December 1577 and, desiring to become a missionary to India, went to Rome and was received as a Jesuit novice at Sant' Andrea on 8 April 1579.  That October he came down with a fever and was sent to Lyons to recuperate. The spy Sledd had been in Rome, and traveling with some Englishmen arrived in Lyon, where he made the acquaintance of Cottam. Discovering that Cottam intended to proceed to England, he made careful note of Cottams's appearance and particulars and continuing on to Paris passed the information to the English ambassador.

From there he went to the English College, Rheims, considering himself accepted for India, if his health improved after a visit to England.  He was ordained around 28 May 1580, at Soissons and left on 5 June with four companions for England.  Betrayed by Sledd, he was immediately arrested at Dover.  Through a ruse by Dr. Ely, one of his fellow-travellers, Cottam reached London safely; however, the good deed put the doctor at risk, and Cottam voluntarily surrendered himself.

He was initially committed "close prisoner" to the Marshalsea, where it is thought he said his first Mass. After being tortured, he was removed on 4 December 1580 to the Tower, where he endured the rack and the scavenger's daughter (twice). Cottam was arraigned with Edmund Campion and others and on 16 November 1581, he was sentenced to death.  His execution was deferred until 30 May 1582, when he was executed at Tyburn.

See also
 Douai Martyrs

References

1549 births
1582 deaths
Executed people from Lancashire
English beatified people
Converts to Roman Catholicism
16th-century English Jesuits
Martyred Roman Catholic priests
People executed under Elizabeth I
16th-century Roman Catholic martyrs
16th-century venerated Christians
Forty-one Martyrs of England and Wales